Joanna Shields, Baroness Shields,  (born 12 July 1962) is a British-American technology industry veteran who currently serves as Group CEO for BenevolentAI.

Shields previously served as UK Minister for Internet Safety and Security, Under-Secretary of State, and Advisor on the Digital Economy to David Cameron. She was made a Life Peer in the House of Lords in 2014. In 2016, Baroness Shields was appointed the Prime Minister's Special Representative on Internet Safety.

Before joining the government, Shields spent over 25 years building some of the world's best-known technology companies, including Electronics for Imaging, RealNetworks, Google, Aol and Facebook, as well as leading several start-ups to successful acquisitions, including Bebo, Decru and Veon.

Early life 
Shields was born in 1962 in St. Marys, Pennsylvania, and was the second of five children.

Career history
In 1984 as a graduate business student, Shields worked part-time at the National Affairs Office of Deloitte in Washington, D.C. Shields was assigned the task of writing a business plan for a start-up called NDC (National Digital Corporation), an early pioneer in the transmission and archival of digital media that was acquired by Gruner + Jahr. During her time there she became convinced that digital technology was going to change the way we live our lives and interact with each other.

While at NDC, Shields met Israeli entrepreneur and founder of Scitex, Efi Arazi, who had formed a new venture called Efi (Electronics for Imaging, Nasdaq:EFII). In 1989 she moved to Silicon Valley and joined the company, where she began working as a product manager and over the course of eight years rose through the ranks to become VP of Production Systems, a division that designed, built and manufactured ASICs, embedded controllers and servers that connected digital printing systems to networks from companies such as HP, Canon, Ricoh, Minolta, Fuji Xerox and Kodak.

In 1997 Shields became CEO of Veon, an interactive video technology company whose intellectual property included patents for adding interactive links to video streams that became part of the MPEG4 streaming video standard. Philips acquired Veon in 2000. After closing the Veon transaction, Shields was hired by the company that invented streaming audio and video, RealNetworks, to run its businesses outside the United States.

Shields briefly joined former Efi CEO and colleague, Dan Avida, to build the business of a storage encryption company he founded called Decru, where she played an instrumental role in forming a partnership with Network Appliance, the company that eventually acquired Decru for $272m.

Shields then became a managing director for Google Europe, Middle East and Africa where she was responsible for developing the company's advertising syndication business, AdSense, and for the acquisition of content and partnerships for such products such as Google Mail, Video (before the YouTube acquisition), Maps, Local, News and Books.

In late 2006 Shields was approached by Benchmark Capital to step in as CEO of the social networking startup Bebo. At Bebo, Shields introduced Open Media, opening Bebo's platform for media companies to reach its 50M user base and enabling media owners to monetise their content, and Bebo Originals, a series of original online shows. The first Bebo Original KateModern was viewed 85M times, was nominated for two BAFTA awards and won the Broadcasting Press Guild Innovation Award for Outstanding Development in Broadcasting.

After engineering Bebo's acquisition for $850m by Aol in May 2008, Shields briefly relocated to New York City to head Aol's newly created People Networks, overseeing the company's social and communications assets including AIM, Aol Instant Messenger and ICQ. Bebo's development continued under Shields with the release of Timeline in 2009, the first social network to organise and represent life events in a linear way. Timeline eventually became standard on social networks when Facebook released the feature in 2012.

In 2009 Shields was recruited by former Google colleague Sheryl Sandberg to run Facebook in Europe, Middle East & Africa as VP & managing director. In her role she built EMEA into the company's largest region, focusing on making Facebook the world's most valuable marketing, communications and customer services platform for brands and leveraging Facebook's Open Graph as a growth engine for some of Europe's hottest startups and established businesses. She also presided over the growth of international presence to over one billion users.

In May 2018, Shields was announced as the Group CEO of BenevolentAI, a London-based medical startup.

Industry recognition 
Shields was ranked No. 1 on the Wired 100 in 2011 and No. 6 in the MediaGuardian 100 in 2012. In February 2013 she was named to the list of the 100 most powerful women in the United Kingdom by BBC Radio 4's Woman's Hour. In July 2013 Computer Weekly named Shields the Most Influential Woman in UK IT. In July 2013 she received the British Interactive Media Association's Lifetime Achievement Award.

Government work
In October 2012 Shields was recruited by Prime Minister Cameron to lead HM Government's Tech City initiative and become the UK's Ambassador for Digital Industries. She was Chair and CEO of Tech City from Jan 2013 to May 2015, during which time,  she worked with the London Stock Exchange to launch the new high-growth segment and created Future Fifty, a programme to identify the 50 fastest growing businesses and support them on the path to an IPO. Future Fifty was launched by the Chancellor George Osborne in April 2013. Shields is also involved in promoting the policies and conditions that foster entrepreneurship across the EU and, along with eight other leading EU entrepreneurs, launched the EU Startup Manifesto, which aims to transform the European Union into a startup-friendly region.

Shields was appointed the Prime Minister's Adviser on the Digital Economy in Summer of 2014 and she served in that role until the May 2015 General Election when David Cameron appointed Baroness Shields as the Minister for Internet Safety and Security and a Parliamentary Under-Secretary for both the Home Office and the Department of Culture, Media and Sport in the newly elected majority government. In July 2016 she was reappointed to her post by Prime Minister Theresa May.

In December 2016, after 18 months at the Department for Culture, Media and Sport and a year as a joint Minister, Shields became a full-time Home Office Minister and the Prime Minister's Special Representative on Internet Crime and Harms, in addition to her role as Minister for Internet Safety & Security. Shields served as Minister for Internet Safety and Security until June 2017 when she stepped down from her ministerial post ahead of the general election to focus on her work with the WeProtect Global Alliance and her role as the Prime Minister's Special Representative on Internet Crime and Harms.

She currently serves the government in the following positions:
 Founder and Member, WeProtect Global Alliance - End Child Sexual Exploitation Online (formerly US/UK Taskforce to combat child online abuse and exploitation)
 Prime Minister's Special Representative on Internet Safety
 Member, Child Protection Implementation Taskforce
 Member, Tackling Extremism in Communities Implementation Taskforce
Shields has formerly served in the following positions:
 Parliamentary Under Secretary of State, Home Office and Minister for Internet Safety and Security
 Interest as Parliamentary Under Secretary of State, Department for Culture, Media and Sport
 Co-Chair, UK Council for Child Internet Safety
 Member, Inter-Ministerial Group on Violence Against Women and Girls
 Member, Inter-Ministerial Group on Child Sexual Abuse
Profile on parliament.uk

Government Focus – To make the internet safer by tackling online child abuse, exploitation and access to harmful content. To help combat online radicalisation and counter extremism and to promote informed digital citizenship.

Spoken material to date:

https://publications.parliament.uk/pa/ld201516/ldhansrd/ldallfiles/peers/lord_hansard_7037_od.html

https://www.gov.uk/government/speeches/securing-childrens-safety-in-a-digital-world

Government honours
Shields was appointed OBE in the 2014 New Year Honours List for "services to digital industries and voluntary service to young people". After being nominated as a working peeress in August 2014, Shields was elevated to the peerage on 16 September 2014 taking the title Baroness Shields, of Maida Vale in the City of Westminster.

Founding of WeProtect Global Alliance
On 22 July 2013, the Prime Minister David Cameron made a speech regarding the proliferation and accessibility of child abuse images on the Internet and about cracking down on online pornography. The Prime Minister announced that a new UK-US taskforce would be created to lead a global alliance of the biggest Internet companies to tackle indecent images of children online. Joanna Shields would head up this initiative, working with UK and US governments and law enforcement agencies and with industry to maximise the international efforts. In April 2014 she founded WeProtect.org. WePROTECT is a global alliance led by the UK government and supported by over 70 countries, 20 technology companies and NGOs to stop the global crime of online child sexual abuse and exploitation.

In April 2014, Shields founded WePROTECT, an initiative designed to engage Internet companies in the development of technology aimed to combat online child abuse and exploitation. In December 2014, David Cameron convened the first WePROTECT global summit in London. This summit and a second hosted in Abu Dhabi by the Interior Ministry of the United Arab Emirates have unified a global multi-stakeholder coalition in commitment to Statements of Action I & II. Shields opened the UAE Summit as keynote speaker in November 2015 and at the United Nations launch of the End Violence Against Children Global Partnership & WePROTECT Initiative Fund in New York, July 2016.

WePROTECT Global Alliance to End Child Sexual Exploitation Online combines two major initiatives: the Global Alliance, led by the U.S. Department of Justice and the EU Commission and WePROTECT, which was convened by the UK. This new, merged initiative has unprecedented reach, with 70 countries already members of WePROTECT or the Global Alliance, along with major international organisations, 20 of the biggest names in the global technology industry, and 17 leading civil society organisations.

www.weprotect.org

Board service & affiliations
Shields also served on several boards as trustee, including Save the Children, the National Society for the Prevention of Cruelty to Children NSPCC, There4Me board, The American School in London, and as a non-executive director on the board of the London Stock Exchange Group and on Mayor Boris Johnson's London Smart Board. She also served on the EU Web Entrepreneurs Leaders' Club[38] established by then EU Commissioner and Vice-President, Neelie Kroes. Shields also served on the Advisory Board of the philanthropy platform Elbi on an unpaid basis until early 2016.

In 2017, Shields became a life member of the Council on Foreign Relations.

In 2018, Shields joined the Alliance of Democracies' Transatlantic Commission on Election Integrity. She participated in the Commission's summit in Copenhagen in July 2018.

In October 2018, Shields was awarded the World Childhood Foundation ThankYou Award . The following month, she received the International Figures Sheikha Fatima bint Mubarak Award for Motherhood and Childhood.

Personal life
She graduated as BS from Penn State University, where she was a member of Chi Omega sorority, and did her post-grad studies as MBA from George Washington University. Shields received a Doctorate in Public Service, Honoris Causa, from George Washington University May 2016.

Honours and awards
 Life Baroness
 Officer of the Order of the British Empire.
New Year Honours: People to watch for Tech personality
Alumni Fellows Award - Penn State 
Distinguished Alumni Award - George Washington University 
AACSB International's "Influential Leaders" Accreditation 2016
Debrett's 500 - Digital & Social Sector
International Figures Sheikha Fatima bint Mubarak Award for Motherhood and Childhood
World Childhood Foundation ThankYou Award - World Childhood Foundation

References

External links

 http://www.joannashields.com * http://www.joannashields.co.uk
 http://www.parliament.uk/biographies/lords/baroness-shields/4325

1962 births
Living people
People from St. Marys, Pennsylvania
George Washington University School of Business alumni
Pennsylvania State University alumni
Facebook employees
American technology chief executives
American women chief executives
AOL employees
Google employees
American emigrants to England
British women business executives
Naturalised citizens of the United Kingdom
British chief executives
Officers of the Order of the British Empire
Life peeresses created by Elizabeth II
Conservative Party (UK) life peers
BBC 100 Women
National Society for the Prevention of Cruelty to Children people
21st-century British women politicians